Bedford Alfred George Jezzard (19 October 1927 – 21 May 2005) was an English footballer. Jezzard's teenage years coincided with the Second World War, and he began football as an amateur with Croxley Boys and later Watford, for whom he made three FA Cup appearances. Upon the resumption of peacetime football, Jezzard spent his entire professional career as a striker at Fulham, during the 1940s and 1950s. He holds the club's post-war record for league goals scored in a season – 39 in 1953–54. His Fulham career lasted only from 1948 to 1957, due to an irreversible injury. During his time at Fulham, he was picked for the London XI in the Inter-Cities Fairs Cup.

He won two England caps in 1954–55 and three England B caps, scoring six goals making him the England B all-time top scorer.

Jezzard later managed Fulham from 1958 until 1964, taking them back into the First Division. He became discontented with the changes in football culture in the mid-1960s – essentially the abolition of the maximum wage (through teammates Jimmy Hill and Johnny Haynes), which led to the concentration of power in the hands of the richer clubs – and retired to run a pub.

He died in May 2005 at the age of 77, and had been ill with multi-infarct dementia for some time before his death.

References

External links 
 England profile (may become incorrect)

1927 births
2005 deaths
People from Clerkenwell
England international footballers
English football managers
English footballers
1954 FIFA World Cup players
Fulham F.C. managers
Fulham F.C. players
England B international footballers
English Football League players
Watford F.C. players
London XI players
English Football League representative players
Association football forwards